Loudsauce was a San Francisco based crowd funding platform for sponsoring ads for social change founded in 2009.  Donors choose the level of funding they want to support and their desired medium, such as TV ads or billboards.  Their mission is to “transform the medium of advertising from one that primarily drives consumption to one of civic participation.”  A recent project on Loudsauce was the creation of a 30-second TV spot in support of Occupy Wall Street.

On 13 February 2013, LoudSauce announced their new crowdfunding product and website, Louder.

Louder was acquired by change.org on 29 October 2015.

See also
 Fondomat
 Kickstarter
 Sellaband
 Comparison of crowd funding services

References

External links
Loudsauce home page

Defunct crowdfunding platforms of the United States